Roland Galčík (born 13 July 2001) is a Slovak footballer who plays for Slovak Fortuna Liga club MŠK Žilina.

Club career

FK Železiarne Podbrezová
Galčík made his Fortuna Liga debut for Železiarne Podbrezová in an away fixture against DAC Dunajská Streda on 20 October 2018, coming on as a late second-half replacement for Matúš Turňa with the final score already set at 3:2.

International career
Galčík was first recognised in a senior national team nomination on 16 March 2022 by Štefan Tarkovič as an alternate ahead of two international friendly fixtures against Norway and Finland. During the March international fixtures, Galčík ended up representing the Slovak U21 side under Jaroslav Kentoš in 2023 Under-21 European Championship qualifiers against Northern Ireland and Spain, being called up on the 17 March.

References

External links
 FK Železiarne Podbrezová official club profile 
 
 Futbalnet profile 
 

 

2001 births
Living people
Slovak footballers
Slovakia under-21 international footballers
Association football midfielders
FK Železiarne Podbrezová players
MŠK Žilina players
Slovak Super Liga players
2. Liga (Slovakia) players
People from Námestovo
Sportspeople from the Žilina Region